Trumbull County is a county in the far northeast portion of U.S. state of Ohio. As of the 2020 census, the population was 201,977. Its county seat and largest city is Warren, which developed industry along the Mahoning River. Trumbull County is part of the Youngstown-Warren-Boardman, OH-PA Metropolitan Statistical Area.

History
In the early years of the European discovery and exploration of the New World, the land that became Trumbull County was originally claimed by French explorers as part of the French colony of Canada (New France). Their settlements had some fur traders who interacted with Native American tribes in this area. After losing the Seven Years' War to Great Britain, France was forced to cede its territories east of the Mississippi River in 1763. Great Britain renamed New France as the Province of Quebec.

Following the United States' victory in its Revolutionary War, the British were forced to cede this land to the new nation. The federal government convinced Connecticut to give up its claim to the land, but it was known as part of the Connecticut Western Reserve in the Northwest Territory. Connecticut retained sovereignty over some of the eastern portion of what became Ohio, selling this area in 1795 to the Connecticut Land Company, a speculative private development firm. As first organized, Trumbull County consisted of the entire area of the Connecticut Western Reserve before population increased, and it was divided into smaller counties. The county's main city, Warren, was originally founded as the capitol of the Western Reserve territory. No Native American settlements have ever formally been identified in Trumbull County, however artifacts are uncovered often. Before 1600, the area was ambiguously between the territories of the Erie people to the east and the Whittlesey Culture to the west. It is currently unknown precisely where one tribe's territory ended and the other began. After the Beaver Wars, the area was frequented by travelling Lenape, Wyandot, Shawnee and Seneca, who all had settlements nearby for a time and shared the valley's animal, food and medicinal resources. They also regularly panned for salt in the marshes.

The county is named for Jonathan Trumbull, Governor of Connecticut, who once owned the land in this region. Early settlements were made along the Mahoning River and other waterways, which provided transportation access and water power to the industries that developed later in the 19th century.

Geography

It is approximately a square with sides of 25 miles; it is the only square county in Ohio.

Adjacent counties
 Ashtabula County (north)
 Crawford County, Pennsylvania (northeast)
 Mercer County, Pennsylvania (east)
 Mahoning County (south)
 Portage County (southwest)
 Geauga County (northwest)

Major highways

Demographics

2010 census
As of the census of 2010, there were 210,312 people, 86,011 households, and 56,874 families living in the county. The racial makeup of the county was 89.0% white, 8.3% black or African American, 0.5% Asian, 0.2% American Indian, 0.3% from other races, and 1.8% from two or more races. Those of Hispanic or Latino origin made up 1.3% of the population. In terms of ancestry, 21.6% were German, 16.5% were American, 14.3% were Irish, 13.7% were Italian, and 10.6% were English.

Of the 86,011 households, 28.8% had children under the age of 18 living with them, 47.4% were married couples living together, 13.7% had a female householder with no husband present, 33.9% were non-families, and 29.2% of all households were made up of individuals. The average household size was 2.40 and the average family size was 2.95. The median age was 42.8 years.

The median income for a household in the county was $42,296 and the median income for a family was $52,731. Males had a median income of $43,382 versus $30,859 for females. The per capita income for the county was $21,854. About 11.5% of families and 15.4% of the population were below the poverty line, including 24.9% of those under age 18 and 8.1% of those age 65 or over.

2000 census
As of the census of 2000, there were 225,116 people, 89,020 households, and 61,690 families living in the county. The population density was 365 people per square mile (141/km2). There were 95,117 housing units at an average density of 154 per square mile (60/km2). The racial makeup of the county was 90.21% White, 7.90% Black or African American, 0.15% Native American, 0.45% Asian, 0.02% Pacific Islander, 0.21% from other races, and 1.07% from two or more races. 0.80% of the population were Hispanic or Latino of any race. 94.6% spoke English and 1.0% German as their first language.

There were 89,020 households, out of which 29.90% had children under the age of 18 living with them, 52.90% were married couples living together, 12.50% had a female householder with no husband present, and 30.70% were non-families. 26.90% of all households were made up of individuals, and 11.40% had someone living alone who was 65 years of age or older. The average household size was 2.48 and the average family size was 3.02.

In the county, the population was spread out, with 24.40% under the age of 18, 7.70% from 18 to 24, 27.30% from 25 to 44, 24.80% from 45 to 64, and 15.70% who were 65 years of age or older. The median age was 39 years. For every 100 females there were 93.80 males. For every 100 females age 18 and over, there were 90.60 males.

The median income for a household in the county was $38,298, and the median income for a family was $46,203. Males had a median income of $36,823 versus $24,443 for females. The per capita income for the county was $19,188. About 7.90% of families and 10.30% of the population were below the poverty line, including 15.40% of those under age 18 and 7.60% of those age 65 or over.

Politics
Trumbull County was historically a Democratic stronghold; in 2016, however, Donald Trump won the county by a reasonably comfortable margin of 6.22%, being the first Republican to win the county since Richard Nixon in 1972. Trump expanded his margin in the county to 10.6 points in 2020.

|}

Government

Trumbull County officials

Trumbull County judgeships

Ohio House of Representatives

Ohio State Senate

United States House of Representatives

United States Senate

Higher learning
 Kent State University Trumbull is a regional campus of Kent State University, offering several associate degrees and a few bachelor's degrees.
 Trumbull County Career and Technical Center is a vocational school, offering different learning and career advancement opportunities for both high school and adult learners.

Communities

Cities

 Cortland
 Girard
 Hubbard
 Niles
 Warren (county seat)
 Youngstown (part)

Villages
 Lordstown
 McDonald
 Newton Falls
 Orangeville
 West Farmington
 Yankee Lake

Townships

 Bazetta
 Bloomfield
 Braceville
 Bristol
 Brookfield
 Champion
 Farmington
 Fowler
 Greene
 Gustavus
 Hartford
 Howland
 Hubbard
 Johnston
 Kinsman
 Liberty
 Mecca
 Mesopotamia
 Newton
 Southington
 Vernon
 Vienna
 Warren
 Weathersfield

Defunct township
 Lordstown Township

Census-designated places

 Bolindale
 Brookfield Center
 Champion Heights
 Churchill
 Hilltop
 Howland Center
 Kinsman Center
 Leavittsburg
 Maplewood Park
 Masury
 McKinley Heights
 Mineral Ridge
 Morgandale
 South Canal
 Vienna Center
 West Hill

Unincorporated communities

 Bristolville
 Burghill
 Center of the World
 Farmdale
 Fowler
 Hartford
 North Bloomfield
 Southington

Ghost towns

 Antietam (in Hartford)
 Bentley (in Brookfield)
 Brockway (in Hartford)
 Chestnut Ridge (in Hubbard)
 Dewey (in Kinsman)
 Doughton (in Hubbard)
 Germantown (in Hubbard)
 Kingsbury (in Mecca)
 Longsville (in Hubbard)
 Mosier (in Liberty)
 Oil Diggings (in Mecca)
 Old Burg Hill (in Hartford)
 Penza (Liberty/ Hubbard border)
 Superior (in Vernon)
 Walnut Hill (in Brookfield)
 Wassie (Bristolville/ Champion border)
 York (in Gustavus)
 Ohltown (in Weathersfield)

The Camp Ravenna Joint Military Training Center, formally known as the Ravenna Training and Logistics Site and commonly known as the Ravenna Arsenal, occupies a small part of Braceville Township.

See also
 National Register of Historic Places listings in Trumbull County, Ohio

References
Specific

External links
 Trumbull County website

 
Appalachian Ohio
Counties of Appalachia
Articles containing video clips
Ohio counties in the Western Reserve